Tyson Michael Blach (born October 20, 1990) is an American professional baseball pitcher in the Colorado Rockies organization. He has previously played in MLB for the San Francisco Giants, Baltimore Orioles and Colorado Rockies.

Career

Amateur career
Blach played baseball and tennis for Regis Jesuit High School in Aurora, Colorado. He then attended Creighton University, where he played college baseball for the Creighton Bluejays.

San Francisco Giants
The San Francisco Giants selected Blach in the fifth round (178th overall) of the 2012 Major League Baseball draft. He made his professional debut in 2013 for the San Jose Giants. In 22 games (20 starts), he went 12–4 with a 2.90 earned run average (ERA), 117 strikeouts and 18 base on balls in  innings. He spent the 2014 season with the Richmond Flying Squirrels where he was 8–8 with a 3.13 ERA in 25 starts. Blach spent 2015 with the Sacramento River Cats where he compiled an 11–12 record and a 4.46 ERA in 27 starts.

The Giants added Blach to their 40-man roster after the 2015 season. Before being called up by the Giants, Blach spent 2016 with Sacramento where he pitched to a 14–7 record with a 3.43 ERA in 26 starts.

Blach was promoted to the Major Leagues for September call-ups on September 1, 2016. Blach made his major league debut on September 5, 2016, against the Colorado Rockies. He entered the game in the bottom of the sixth inning and pitched three scoreless innings while allowing one hit. On October 1, 2016, in his second MLB start, Blach pitched eight shutout innings against Clayton Kershaw and the Los Angeles Dodgers, allowing three hits and securing his first win. He also had his first and second MLB hits against Kershaw.  Blach was the winning pitcher in Game 3 of the 2016 NLDS against the Chicago Cubs after pitching two scoreless innings in relief. In four games (two starts) for San Francisco, he was 1–0 with a 1.06 ERA.

Despite being a starter throughout his minor league career, Blach opened the 2017 season in the Giants bullpen as their lone left-handed reliever; however, later in April, after pitcher Madison Bumgarner was injured, Blach was put into the starting rotation. On August 3, Blach hit his first major league home run. He spent all of 2017 with the Giants, going 8–12 with a 4.78 ERA in 34 games (24 starts). He had the fewest strikeouts per 9 innings in the major leagues (4.01).

Blach started Opening Day of the 2018 MLB season against the Los Angeles Dodgers, his first career Opening Day start.  He gave up three hits, three walks, and no runs over five innings to earn the win over Clayton Kershaw. Blach would then for the remainder of the season switch between a starting and relief role for San Francisco. He ended the season with a 6–7 record in 47 games, 13 starts. He struck out 75 batters in  innings.

In 2019, Blach spent the majority of the first half in the Giants minor league system. He was designated for assignment on July 27, 2019.

Baltimore Orioles
Blach was claimed off waivers by the Baltimore Orioles on August 3, 2019. Blach made 5 appearances for Baltimore, but struggled to an 11.32 ERA in 20.2 innings pitched. On September 16, Blach was designated for assignment, and was outrighted to the Triple-A Norfolk Tides on September 19. He made 2 appearances for the Tides before the end of the year, but struggled tremendously, allowing 10 runs in 5.1 innings of work. Blach did not play in a minor league game in 2020 due to the cancellation of the minor league season because of the COVID-19 pandemic. On July 15, 2020, Blach underwent Tommy John surgery, causing him to miss the truncated 2020 Major League season. On August 10, Blach was released by the Orioles organization. On March 30, 2021, Blach re-signed with the Orioles on a minor league contract. Blach would return to play in 2021, playing in 16 games between the Florida Complex League Orioles and the Single-A Delmarva Shorebirds, pitching to a 1.23 ERA with 23 strikeouts in 22.0 innings pitched. He elected free agency following the season on November 7.

Colorado Rockies
On December 17, 2021, Blach signed a minor league contract with the Colorado Rockies. On April 4, 2022, Blach had his contract selected to the major league roster. He re-signed a minor league deal on January 10, 2023.

References

External links

Creighton Bluejays bio

1990 births
Living people
Baseball players from Denver
Major League Baseball pitchers
San Francisco Giants players
Baltimore Orioles players
Colorado Rockies players
Creighton Bluejays baseball players
San Jose Giants players
Richmond Flying Squirrels players
Sacramento River Cats players
Norfolk Tides players
Florida Complex League Orioles players